Moskovsky (masculine), Moskovskaya (feminine), or Moskovskoye (neuter) is the name of several inhabited localities in Russia.

Urban localities
Moskovsky, Moscow, formerly a town in Leninsky District of Moscow Oblast, merged into the city of Moscow on July 1, 2012

Rural localities
Moskovsky, Altai Krai, a settlement in Krutikhinsky District of Altai Krai
Moskovsky, Chelyabinsk Oblast, a settlement in Chesmensky District of Chelyabinsk Oblast
Moskovsky, name of several other rural localities
Moskovskaya (rural locality), a village in Afanasyevsky District of Kirov Oblast
Moskovskoye, Republic of Khakassia, a selo in Ust-Abakansky District of the Republic of Khakassia
Moskovskoye, Stavropol Krai, a selo in Izobilnensky District of Stavropol Krai